Brush Glacier is a broad glacier in the northwest part of the Bear Peninsula, flowing west into Dotson Ice Shelf to the north of Jeffrey Head, in Marie Byrd Land. The head of the glacier is marked by rocky, wedge-shaped Rogers Spur. Webster Pass divides Brush Glacier from Holt Glacier.

Both features were first mapped by the United States Geological Survey (USGS) from air photos taken by U.S. Navy Operation Highjump in January 1947, and named by the Advisory Committee on Antarctic Names (US-ACAN) for personnel at the Byrd Substation. The glacier was named for station engineer Bernard E. Brush and the spur for electrical engineer James C. Rogers.

References

Glaciers of Marie Byrd Land